Jean-Pierre Roth (born in 28.04.1946) is a Swiss banker who served as chairman of the Swiss National Bank from 1 January 2001 until 31 December 2009.

He joined the Swiss National Bank in 1979, working in Zürich and Bern. He became vice-chairman of the governing board in 1996. In 2001, he became chairman of the governing board.

Between 2001 and 2009 he was Governor of the Washington-based International Monetary Fund (IMF) for Switzerland and chairman of the board of directors of the Bank for International Settlements (BIS) in Basel.

Presently, he is a board member of Nestlé and the Swatch Group.

Roth has been credited with the measures taken to restore public confidence in the Swiss banking system and blamed for destroying the Swiss franc. Although he certainly had input into the measures implemented by the Swiss banking system and the Swiss government, he certainly did not single-handedly do either.

Education
He received a doctorate in economics from the Graduate Institute of International Studies in Geneva. He pursued postdoctoral studies at Massachusetts Institute of Technology (MIT).

Personal life
Roth is married and has three children. In 2009, he took an early retirement. He and his wife live in Geneva.

References

1946 births
Chairmen of the Board of Swiss National Bank
Living people
Graduate Institute of International and Development Studies alumni
Businesspeople from Geneva